Matvey Ivanovich Skobelev (November 9, 1885, Baku – July 29, 1938, Moscow) was a Russian Marxist revolutionary and politician.

Biography

Trotsky's Disciple in Vienna (1908–1912)
Skobelev was born in the family of a wealthy Baku oilman and industrialist of the Molokan faith. He joined the Russian Social Democratic Labor Party in 1903. After the Russian Revolution of 1905 he went abroad to study at a polytechnic in Vienna. While in Vienna, he became a friend and supporter of Leon Trotsky, whose bi-weekly Pravda he helped edit in 1908–1912. Skobelev and another editor,  Adolph Joffe, both scions of wealthy families, also helped Trotsky finance the paper.

Duma Deputy (1912–1917)
In the summer of 1912 Skobelev went back to his native Caucasus and was elected to the 4th Duma (1912–1917) from the Social Democrats. He soon came under the influence of the head of the Menshevik part of the Social Democratic faction in the Duma, Nikolay Chkheidze, and supported him against the Bolshevik emigre leaders (Vladimir Lenin, Grigory Zinoviev and Lev Kamenev) who, in 1912–1913, were trying to get the Bolshevik deputies to break away from the Menshevik majority and form a separate faction in the Duma. After the faction finally split in mid-1913, Skobelev and Chkheidze went to London for the December 1, 1913 meeting of the International Socialist Bureau to apply pressure on the Bolshevik deputies to preserve socialist unity, ultimately unsuccessfully . At the outbreak of World War I in 1914, Skobelev and Chkheidze tentatively supported the war effort while remaining critical of the Russian government's internal policies and prosecution of the war. Skobelev, like Chkheidze, was an active member of the irregular freemasonic lodge, the Grand Orient of Russia’s Peoples.

Revolutionary Leader (1917)

During the February Revolution of 1917, Skobelev and other Menshevik Duma deputies became leaders of the Petrograd Soviet when it was formed on February 27, Skobelev at first serving as chairman. On March 7, Skobelev became one of the 5 original members of the Contact Committee of the Petrograd Soviet which coordinated policy decisions with the newly formed Russian Provisional Government. On March 12, he was elected deputy chairman of the Petrograd Soviet's Executive Committee with Chkheidze as chairman. When the Mensheviks agreed to join the Provisional Government on May 5, Skobelev became the new government's Minister of Labor. On May 23–24, Skobelev and Irakli Tsereteli hammered out a compromise with rebellious Kronstadt sailors who, led by Bolsheviks Fedor Raskolnikov and Semion Roshal, had formed a self-styled autonomous Kronstadt Republic. The compromise avoided a showdown with the Provisional Government .

He was also elected deputy chairman of the All Russian Soviet Executive Committee at the first Soviet Congress in June 1917. In August 1917 he published two government "circulars", which attempted to limit factory workers' rights as follows:

August 23 - restated the prerogative of management to hire and fire, and the illegality of "coercion", which rendered the culprits liable to criminal prosecution
August 28 - reminded factory inspectors and commissars that factory committees could only meet outside hours, and that workers had a duty to maintain productivity, "in order to satisfy the demands of the country’s defense and the urgent needs of the population" 

After resigning his post as Minister of Labor in September 1917, on October 3–5 Skobelev was made the All-Russian Soviet Executive Committee's representative ("nakaz") at the upcoming Paris conference of Allied powers, a position made defunct by the Bolshevik seizure of power during the October revolution of 1917 .

After the Revolution (1918–1938)
Opposed to the Bolshevik regime, Skobelev moved to his home city of Baku in then-independent Azerbaijan ca. 1919 . After the Bolshevik victory in the Russian Civil War and re-annexation of Azerbaijan in 1920, he fled to Paris. Once the Bolshevik government instituted the NEP policy of partial liberalization, Skobelev became reconciled with the new regime and eventually joined the Russian Communist Party (b) 1922 (over Trotsky's objections ). In late 1922, he worked on facilitating trade relations between France and Russia  and then returned to Russia, where he continued working in the Soviet foreign trade system until his arrest and execution in 1938 during the Great Purge.

Notes
 See Part 3, Chapter 6 of Alan Woods' A History of the Bolshevik Party, Wellred Publications, 1999  . In his memoirs, Trotsky identifies Skobelev's father as a "mill owner", presumably because the Skobelev brothers built Baku's largest flour mill, Old Mill, in 1903–1909.
 See Part 4 of Alan Woods's Bolshevism: The Road to Revolution
 See The Russian Provisional Government 1917: Documents, edited by Robert P. Browder and Alexander F. Kerensky, Stanford University Press, 1961, ii, 721-22, quoted in 
 See Instructions to Skobelev
 See Chapter 9 of Naki Keykurun's memoirs where he describes meeting Skobelev in Baku in 1919
 See Chapter XXIV of Trotsky's autobiography My Life (1930)
 See Michael Jabara Carley, Episodes from the Early Cold War: Franco-Soviet Relations, 1917–1927 in Europe-Asia Studies, ISSN 0966-8136 Nov 2000, Vol. 52 Issue 7, p. 1275. Available online as of November 2005.

External links
 Instructions to Skobelev in early October 1917 during World War I peace negotiations Contains a short biography

References

1885 births
1938 deaths
Politicians from Baku
People from Baku Governorate
Azerbaijani people of Russian descent
Russian Social Democratic Labour Party members
Mensheviks
Bolsheviks
Ministers of the Russian Provisional Government
Members of the 4th State Duma of the Russian Empire
Russian Constituent Assembly members
Soviet politicians
Great Purge victims from Azerbaijan
Members of the Communist Party of the Soviet Union executed by the Soviet Union